María Soledad Barría Iroume (born 27 October 1953) is a Chilean physician who served as minister during the first government of Michelle Bachelet (2006–2010).

References

1953 births
Living people
Chilean physicians
University of Chile alumni
Socialist Party of Chile politicians
21st-century Chilean politicians
21st-century Chilean women politicians
Government ministers of Chile
Women government ministers of Chile
People from Osorno, Chile